Sterrebeek is a town in the municipality (gemeente) of Zaventem, and a suburb on the east-northeast side of Brussels.

Brussels American School (the United States Department of Defense school) is located in Sterrebeek.

The official language is Dutch (as everywhere in Flanders).

See also 
 Lord of Saventhem and Sterrebeke

References

External links
 Gazetteer Entry

Populated places in Flemish Brabant
Zaventem